David Busby (born 3 February 1994) is an Irish rugby union player, currently playing for the Seattle Seawolves in Major League Rugby. He plays as a wing or fullback.

Busby was born in Portadown, Northern Ireland and attended Portadown College and Queen's University. He made his senior Ulster debut on 21 February 2017 in round 16 of the 2016–17 Pro12, featuring off the bench and scoring a try in the provinces 40–17 away win against Italian side Zebre. He joined the Seattle Seawolves for the 2020 Major League Rugby season.

References

External links
Ulster Profile
Pro14 Profile

1994 births
Living people
Irish rugby union players
Rugby union centres
Rugby union players from Portadown
Rugby union wings
Seattle Seawolves players
Ulster Rugby players